Global cultural flow involves the flow of people, artifacts, and ideas across national boundaries as result of globalization. Global cultural flows can be observed in five interdependent 'Landscapes', or dimensions, that distinguish the fundamental disjunctures between economy, culture, and politics in the global cultural economy. 

The five dimensions of global cultural flow include: 

 ethnoscapes — flow of people Human migrations; 
 technoscapes — flow and configurations of technology; 
 financescapes — flow of money and global Business networks; 
 mediascapes — flow of cultural industry networks; and 
 ideoscapes — flow of ideas, images, and their nexuses. 

These dimensions restructure "the means by which individuals establish personal and collective identities." The common suffix  denotes these terms as being "perspectival constructs inflected…by the historical, linguistic, and political situatedness of different kinds of actors: nation-states, multinationals, diasporic communities, as well as subnational groupings and movements (whether religious, political or economic)," as well as "intimate face-to-face groups, such as villages, neighborhoods and families." 

The five dimensions were introduced by anthropologist and globalization theorist Arjun Appadurai in his essay "Disjuncture and difference in the global cultural economy" (1990). Because cultural exchange and transactions have typically been restricted in the past due to geographical and economical obstacles, Appadurai's five dimensions allow for cultural transactions to occur.

Global cultural flows 
The concept of global cultural flows was introduced by anthropologist Arjun Appadurai in his essay "Disjuncture and difference in the global cultural economy" (1990), in which he argues that people ought to reconsider the Binary oppositions that were imposed through colonialism, such as those of ‘global’ vs. ‘local’, south vs. north, and metropolitan vs. non-metropolitan. He instead proposes that "flows" or "scapes" move through the world, carrying capital, images, people, information, technologies, and ideas. 

As these flows travel through national boundaries, they form different combinations and interdependencies, mutate, and divide cultural ideas into "nation" and "state." 

Appadurai further states that, despite disjunctures having always existed between the flows of people, machinery, money, ideas and images, the world is at a crossroads where this is happening to a larger extent; he thus points to the importance of studying the "-scapes." These disjunctures also contribute to the central idea of deterritorialization, which Appadurai describes as the main force affecting globalization in the sense that people from different countries and socioeconomic backgrounds are mixing with one another; namely, the lower classes of some countries integrating in to wealthier societies via the workforce. Subsequently, these people reproduce their ethnic culture, but in a deterritorialized context. 

Appadurai claims that global flows occur in and through the growing disjunctures between the scapes. The Olympic Games, for instance, organize financescapes (regional, national, and international business networks come in to invest in the host city) and mediascapes (the opening and closing ceremonies showcase national cultures), as well as ideoscapes (images of the host city and country, their history, and customs circulate worldwide to attract tourists) and ethnoscapes (migrations of business networks and localities that are removed from parts of the city to make space for Olympic venues). Finanscapes can become in disjunction with ethnoscapes, as networks of global Social movements often protest against Human Rights Violations that take place during the Games; as result, ideoscapes then clash with ethnoscapes, as city brands and narratives are disrupted by these demonstrations and subsequent negative press.

The five dimensions

Ethnoscape 
The ethnoscape refers to human migration, the flow of people across boundaries. This includes migrants, refugees, exiles, and tourists, among other moving individuals and groups, all of whom appear to affect the politics of (and between) nations to a considerable degree.

Ethnoscapes allow for one to recognize that their notions of space, place, and community have become much more complex—indeed, a ‘single community’ may now be dispersed across the globe. Appadurai claims that this is not to say there are no relatively stable communities and networks of kinship, friendship, work, and leisure, as well as of birth, residence, and other filial forms. Rather, it highlights that the shape of these stabilities is warped by human motion, as more people deal with the realities of having to move or the desires of wanting to move.

Tourism, in particular, generally provide people from developed countries with contact to people in the Developing World.

Technoscape 
The technoscape is the flow of technology (mechanical and informational) and the ability to move such technology at rapid speeds. The flow of technology especially increases as the pace of technological innovation increases.

Accordingly, the introduction of new technology (e.g., the Internet) increases cultural interactions and exchanges. For example, smartphones are moved across boundaries and radically affect day-to-day life for individuals all along the commodity chain.

Financescape 
Financescape refers to the flow of money and global business networks across borders. Appadurai poses that when considering the financescape framework, one must consider how global capital today moves in an increasingly fluid and non-isomorphic manner, thus contributing to an overall unpredictability of all the five aspects of global cultural flows as a whole. 

The fluidity of capital has been expounded on further by sociologists such as Anthony Giddens, who, in his 1999 BBC Reith lecture on globalization, claims that the advent of electronic money has rendered the transfer of capital and finance around the world subject to an increasingly easy process that posits a major paradigm shift. Giddens suggests that this ease has the potential to destabilize what would be considered prior as stable economies.

Today, the global transfer of money has only accelerated in pace, with transactions in various large, international finance hubs (e.g. NYSE) have almost immediate effects on economies around the globe.

Mediascape 

The mediascape refers to the scope of electronic and print media in global cultural flows; it refers both to the distribution of the electronic capabilities to produce and disseminate information (newspapers, Magazines, television, Films, etc.), as well as to "the images of the world created by these media." Such mediascapes provide vast deposits of images, narratives, and ethnoscapes to viewers, profoundly mixing the "world of commodities" and the "world of news and politics."

In particular, advertising can directly impact the landscape (in the form of posters and billboards) and also subtly influence—through persuasive techniques and an increasingly pervasive presence—the way that people perceive reality.

The term mediascape predates Appadurai's use; it was first used in trade by the American company Mediascape Corporation, formed in 1992, for the purpose of delivering rich media through the Internet and Web. The corporation is the U.S. owner of the federal trademark for use of that mark in relation to multimedia products in commerce.

The term mediascape may also describe visual culture. For example, "the American mediascape is becoming increasingly partisan" or simply to denote "what's on" as in "a quick survey of the British mediascape shows how much Channel 4 has lost its way". It is also used as a generic term to describe a digital media artifact where items of digital media are associated with regions in space and can then be triggered by the location of the person experiencing the media. Thus, in a mediascape, a person may walk around an area and as they do so they will hear digitally stored sounds associated with different places in that area.

Ideoscape 
The ideoscape is the flow of ideas and ideologies, and is composed of concepts, terms, and images. This movement of ideas can take place on a small-scale, such as an individual sharing their personal views on Twitter, or it can take place on a larger and more systematic level (such as missionaries).

The ideoscape is often political and usually has to do with the ideologies of states along with the counter-ideologies of movements explicitly oriented towards capturing state power *or a piece of it). Ideoscapes therefore can consist of such ideas as "freedom, welfare, rights, sovereignty, representation, and democracy."

See also 
 Media-related:
 audio tour
 GPS tour
 podguide
 Media Scape
 Mscape

References

Global cultural flows
Global cultural flows
Technoscape
Global cultural flows